Edward Owen Leonard (born 15 August 2002) is an English cricketer. After completing his education at Millfield, in September 2020, Leonard was awarded a two-year professional contract with Somerset County Cricket Club graduating from the club's academy. He made his List A debut on 30 July 2021, for Somerset in the 2021 Royal London One-Day Cup. He made his first-class debut on 12 September 2021, for Somerset in the 2021 County Championship. He made his Twenty20 debut on 27 May 2022, for Somerset against the Sri Lanka Cricket Development XI during their tour of England.

References

External links
 

2002 births
Living people
English cricketers
Somerset cricketers
Devon cricketers
People from Hammersmith
People educated at Millfield